Poole Bay Cliffs is a Site of Special Scientific Interest, as prescribed by Natural England and the Department for Environment, Food and Rural Affairs. The site is in the Poole Bay area of Poole, Dorset, England.

References 

Poole Harbour
Geography of Dorset
Sites of Special Scientific Interest in Dorset